Bessemer Venture Partners (BVP) is an American venture capital firm headquartered in San Francisco. Outside the United States, it has offices in India, Israel and the United Kingdom. In 2022, Venture Capital Journal ranked the firm as the 8th largest venture capital firm based on total fundraising over the most recent five-year period.

History 

In 1911, Henry Phipps Jr., a co-founder of Carnegie Steel, formed Bessemer Trust in New York to manage his family’s assets. In 1911, he spun out Bessemer Securities as a separate entity which had $20 million assets under management which invested in venture capital deals, publicly traded securities and real estate.

In 1974, Bessemer Trust opened up to outside investors although Bessemer Securities still managed only the capital of the Phipps family which allowed it to pursue more aggressive and riskier investment strategies such as investing in private technology and medical companies. 

In 1975, Bessemer Securities opened an office in Silicon Valley. 

In the 1970s, Bessemer Securities suffered from significant losses due to real estate investments.

In 1986, Bessemer Securities had $950 million assets under management and had continued to expand its investment team by hiring venture capital specialists.

Eventually the venture capital investment operation of Bessemer Securities was spun out separately as Bessemer Venture Partners. Bessemer Securities is still considered the parent company of BVP as it provides funding and support to the firm.

In 2000, BVP started investing in areas outside the U.S. which included India, Israel, Latin America and Europe. It also briefly had an office in China before closing it in 2006.

Around this period, BVP set up a section on its website named Anti-Portfolio which contains a list of major investment opportunities it had missed. The list included Apple Inc., EBay, Gateway, Inc. and Blue Nile.

In 2007, BVP closed Bessemer Venture Partners VII which was its first fund that took capital from outside investors. Prior to that, capital was provided only by the Phipps Family or by Bessemer Securities.

In 2021, BVP set up a private equity team and in September 2022, the team now called BVP Forge closed its first buyout fund.

References

External links
 

1911 establishments in New York (state)
American companies established in 1911
Companies based in Redwood City, California
Financial services companies established in 1911
Venture capital firms of the United States